Marko Pogačnik (born 11 August 1944) is a Slovenian artist and author.

Background

Pogačnik studied at the Academy of Arts in Ljubljana, the capital of Slovenia, where he graduated in 1967. He was a co-founder of the neo-avantgarde artistic movement OHO, members of which were also Tomaž Šalamun and Slavoj Žižek. From the 1980s, he embraced a holistic vision of art. He claims to have developed a method of earth healing similar to acupuncture by using pillars and positioning them on so called 'lithopuncture' points of the landscape.

In 1991, he designed the official coat of arms of the newly constituted Republic of Slovenia. In the year 2006, he joined the Movement for Justice and Development led by Janez Drnovšek, the President of Slovenia at the time.

In 1998, together with his daughter Ana, he founded the Lifenet movement, which has been described by scholars as a "typical New Age" group.

He lives and works in the village of Šempas in the lower Vipava Valley. In the last decade, the town of Nova Gorica, in which municipal territory he resides, has commissioned a number of public monuments from Pogačnik, most notably the monument to the 1000 years of the first mention of Gorica and Solkan, which stands in the town's central public square.

Since 2008, a group of his monuments and birch trees, titled the Hologram of Europe, stands at the crossroad of Tivoli Street and Slovene Street in Ljubljana.

Awards
In 1991, Marko Pogačnik received the Prešeren Fund Award for his work. In 2008, he received the Jakopič Award, the central Slovenian fine arts award. He was nominated two times for the Right Livelihood Award.

Publications 
Nature Spirits and Elemental Beings - Working with the Intelligence in Nature (Findhorn Press, Scotland, 1996).

References

External links
Personal site. Markopogacnik.com.

1944 births
Writers from Kranj
Spiritual writers
Findhorn community
20th-century Slovenian sculptors
20th-century Slovenian male artists
21st-century Slovenian sculptors
Jakopič Award laureates
Artists from Kranj
Slovenian environmentalists
Living people